N. cinerea is an abbreviated binomial name that may refer to the following species:

Bacteria
 Neisseria cinerea – a proteobacterium

Plants
 Namibia cinerea – a dicot

Insects
 Nauphoeta cinerea – speckled cockroach
 Nemacerota cinerea – a moth
 Nepa cinerea – a water scorpion

Mammals
 Neophoca cinerea – Australian sea lion
 Neotoma cinerea – bushy-tailed woodrat